Delaware is a town in Nowata County, Oklahoma, United States. The population was 267 at the 2020 census, a decline of 35.9 percent from the figure of 417 recorded in 2010. The town is named for the Eastern Delaware tribe that moved into this area from Kansas after signing a treaty with the Cherokee Nation in 1867.

Geography
Delaware is on rolling prairie just west of the Verdigris River.

History
In 1889, the Kansas and Arkansas Valley Railroad built a line through this area. It constructed a switch at the present townsite, which it named Comana Switch. A small community sprung up here, which soon became known as Delaware. The name became permanent when a post office was established by that name on March 19, 1898.

Discovery of oil nearby in 1904 briefly turned Delaware into a boom town with four thousand residents. However, the bubble burst and the population quickly fell to 108 by November, 1907. The population has fluctuated since then, though generally declining from an official high of 804 in 1920.

Demographics

As of the census of 2000, there were 456 people, 171 households, and 129 families residing in the town. There were 194 housing units at an average density of 514.6 per square mile (197.1/km2). The racial makeup of the town was 73.25% White, 21.93% Native American, 0.44% from other races, and 4.39% from two or more races. Hispanic or Latino of any race were 0.66% of the population.

There were 171 households, out of which 36.8% had children under the age of 18 living with them, 60.2% were married couples living together, 9.9% had a female householder with no husband present, and 24.0% were non-families. 20.5% of all households were made up of individuals, and 9.9% had someone living alone who was 65 years of age or older. The average household size was 2.67 and the average family size was 3.05.

In the town, the population was spread out, with 28.1% under the age of 18, 11.0% from 18 to 24, 27.9% from 25 to 44, 20.6% from 45 to 64, and 12.5% who were 65 years of age or older. The median age was 36 years. For every 100 females, there were 109.2 males. For every 100 females age 18 and over, there were 97.6 males.

The median income for a household in the town was $28,167, and the median income for a family was $31,071. Males had a median income of $27,917 versus $18,125 for females. The per capita income for the town was $11,099. About 9.7% of families and 18.5% of the population were below the poverty line, including 20.7% of those under age 18 and 22.7% of those age 65 or over.

References

External links

Towns in Nowata County, Oklahoma
Towns in Oklahoma